Vito Bratta (born July 1, 1961) is an American guitarist and the former main songwriter for the glam metal band White Lion. He co-founded White Lion with lead singer Mike Tramp in 1983 and played with the band until 1991. Bratta was influenced by Jimmy Page, Eddie Van Halen, and other rock and blues guitar players of the 1970s and 80s.  His playing has been described as melodic, original and technically accomplished.  Bratta often employed two-handed tapping, sweep picking, pinch harmonics and various whammy bar techniques.

In 2003, Mike Tramp attempted to reunite with Bratta but was unsuccessful. Tramp talked about Bratta in a 2007 interview with Anarchy Music, claiming Bratta was always quiet and maintained a certain distance from the rest of the band.

On February 16, 2007, Bratta gave his first live interview in over 12 years. The following points were revealed during the Eddie Trunk interview: Bratta's father went through a 5-year illness, which required a large amount of personal time and commitment on Vito's part, both emotionally and financially. In 1997, he injured his wrist and finds it painful to move his hand up and down an electric guitar's neck; however he still manages to play classical guitars without excessive discomfort.  In addition, he clarified that he has never ruled out a White Lion/Mike Tramp reunion; up until now, they have simply been impossible due to family obligations and his wrist injury.

In April 2007, Vito Bratta made his first public musical appearances in over 15 years, at both Friday and Saturday nights shows at the L'Amour Reunion Shows in New York.

Legacy
Although Bratta has not released any music since 1992, many musicians, both singers and guitar players, have continued to praise his songwriting skills and technical ability. Zakk Wylde has stated that Bratta is the only guitarist whose tapped playing he enjoys. He has also praised Vito Bratta's originality and pointed out that he considers the solo in "Wait" one of the best solos he has ever heard. Bratta's partner in White Lion, Mike Tramp, also remarked that Bratta's skills as a guitar player and songwriter were unmatched:

Tramp also mentioned that many accomplished guitar players turned him down when he attempted to put together a new version of White Lion:
 

Guitar World Magazine named Bratta one of the best 20 guitarists of the 1980s, commenting:

Producer Michael Wagener called Bratta his "favorite guitar player" on February 17, 2007, when he called the Eddie Trunk show.

References

External links
Roadrunnerrecords.com
Connect.in.com

1961 births
Living people
American heavy metal guitarists
People from Staten Island
White Lion members
Lead guitarists
Songwriters from New York (state)
Guitarists from New York City
20th-century American guitarists
Glam metal musicians